Adilson Soares Cassamá (born 20 April 1983), known simply as Adilson, is a Bissau-Guinean former footballer who played as a defensive midfielder. Adilson played for multiple clubs including FC Porto in their youth ranks, União Lamas, C.D. Nacional, C.F. União, C.F. Estrela da Amadora and Jeunesse Junglinster.

He also represented the Guinea-Bissau national football team from 2003 until 2008.

External links

1983 births
Living people
Sportspeople from Bissau
Bissau-Guinean footballers
Association football midfielders
Primeira Liga players
Liga Portugal 2 players
Segunda Divisão players
C.F. União de Lamas players
C.D. Nacional players
C.F. União players
C.F. Estrela da Amadora players
A.D. Ovarense players
Real S.C. players
C.D. Fátima players
First Professional Football League (Bulgaria) players
PFC Cherno More Varna players
C.D. Monte Carlo players
Guinea-Bissau international footballers
Bissau-Guinean expatriate footballers
Expatriate footballers in Portugal
Expatriate footballers in Bulgaria
Expatriate footballers in Macau
Expatriate footballers in Luxembourg
Bissau-Guinean expatriate sportspeople in Portugal
Bissau-Guinean expatriate sportspeople in Bulgaria
Bissau-Guinean expatriate sportspeople in Macau
Bissau-Guinean expatriate sportspeople in Luxembourg